The 1985 Better Brakes 300 was an endurance race for Group A touring cars held at the Amaroo Park circuit in Sydney, New South Wales on 4 August 1985. The race was the opening round of the 1985 Australian Endurance Championship.

The field was divided into three classes according to engine displacement. 
Class A : 3001cc to 6000cc
Class B : 2001cc to 3000cc
Class C : Up to 2000cc

The race was won by the 1985 Australian Touring Car Champion Jim Richards driving his championship winning JPS Team BMW 635 CSi. Richards won the race by two laps from two more New Zealanders, Kent Baigent and Neal Lowe driving an ex-Schnitzer BMW 635 CSi, with Peter Brock in his Mobil Holden Dealer Team VK Commodore finishing third.

Colin Bond and Gregg Hansford finished 5th outright and 1st in Class B driving the Network Alfa Romeo GTV6 after a race long battle with the JPS BMW 323i of Tony Longhurst. Class C was won by the Team Toyota Australia Corolla of former open wheel star driver John Smith who also finished 7th outright.

One of the pre-race favourites, the Volvo 240T of Kiwi Robbie Francevic was out before the race started as the left front wheel parted company with the car on the formation lap going through Suttons Corner. Allan Grice, having his first ever Group A start driving in The Toy Shop Alfa GTV6, was out after just three laps with gearbox failure.

Richards qualified on pole for the race with a time of 53.80 seconds.

Results

* The event attracted 24 starters.

Notes
 Pole Position: #1 Jim Richards, BMW 635 CSi - 0:53.80
 Fastest Lap: #1 Jim Richards, BMW 635 CSi - 0:55.11
 Race Time: 2:28:08.6

References

See also
Australian Motor Racing Year, 1985/86
James Hardie 1000, 1985/86
The Australian Racing History of Ford, 1989
The Official Racing History of Holden, 1988

Better Brakes 300